Union Sportive du Pays de Cassel is a football club based in Arneke in the Nord department of France. Since the 2020–21 season, it competes in the Régional 1, the sixth tier of French football.

History 
US Pays de Cassel was founded in 2018 after the merger of four smaller local clubs: Hardifort, Noordpenne-Zuytpeene, Bavinchove-Cassel and Arnèke.

On 14 January 2023, Pays de Cassel eliminated Championnat National 2 (fourth-tier) side Wasquehal in the round of 64 of the Coupe de France following a penalty shoot-out. This set up an encounter with Ligue 1 champions Paris Saint-Germain in the following round, played at the Stade Bollaert-Delelis in Lens as Pays de Cassel's stadium did not meet the criteria to hold the game. At the time, Pays de Cassel had an annual budget of €150,000 while PSG's was €800 million; the two clubs were worth €400,000 and €3.2 billion, respectively. PSG won 7–0, with five goals from Kylian Mbappé.

Squad

References

External links 

 Club website

Football clubs in Hauts-de-France
2018 establishments in France
Association football clubs established in 2018
Sport in Nord (French department)